Barre, Vermont may refer to:
Barre (city), Vermont
Barre (town), Vermont